Globi is a Swiss cartoon character occasionally referred to as Switzerland's Mickey Mouse. He is pictured as an anthropomorphic blue parrot with a yellow beak wearing a black beret and a pair of red and black checkered trousers. He was created by the Swiss cartoonist Robert Lips, as an advertising character for the Swiss department store Globus in 1932 for the company's 25th anniversary. He was originally planned to be called "Kimbukku", but later renamed Globi after the local Basel German (Baseldytsch) dialect word for the department store that created him.

History
He initially appeared in a cartoon strip called Der Globi, and later appeared in a cartoon picture-book form called Globi's World Voyage in 1935.  By 1944, the character gained so much popularity that Globus created a separate company for it, and in 1948 Globi had sold over one million picture books. He was introduced in other markets such as the Netherlands, Belgium and Brazil, but did not do as well. In the 1970s, he was accused of being sexist, racist, and promoting violence, which was based on the attitudes of the 1940s and 1950s, but the articles in question were then withdrawn and revised.

Present
He is one of the most popular characters in the German-Speaking part of Switzerland, with sales of over 9 million books. However, he stays mostly unknown in the French and Italian speaking parts of the country.

In October 2003, a full-length film, Globi and the Stolen Shadows was made which was based on him. It was directed by Robi Engler in Anime-style. Beside the books, there is a lot of Globi merchandise, including cuddly toys, crockery, cutlery, clocks, school equipment, card games, food. From December 2008, the Swiss town of Engelberg hosts a Globi theme park.

References

External links

Globi's website (in German)

Swiss comic strips
1932 comics debuts
Comics characters introduced in 1932
Swiss comics characters
Advertising characters
Swiss culture
Birds in art
Fictional Swiss people
Fictional parrots
Anthropomorphic animal characters
Male characters in comics
Male characters in animation
Male characters in advertising
Comics adapted into animated films